Philippe Proulx is a musician from Quebec. He records under the name Pépé et sa guitare (Pépé and His Guitar).  On his albums, he accompanies himself on the guitar or the ukulele.  In concert, he plays with a varied group of musicians under the name Pépé et son orchestre (Pépé and His Orchestra).

Biography

Philippe Proulx was born in 1978 in Saint-Basile-de-Portneuf.  He started playing piano at age 4, and began the guitar at 11.  He became well known after winning a series of music prizes: Best New Artist, Singer-songwriter at the Festival en Chanson de Petite-Vallée, 2003 ; Découverte de la chanson de Magog, 2003  (site in French); and second prize at Cégep en spectacle in Jonquière, 2002.  He has played in the Fringante Caravane with Les Cowboys Fringants, Loco Locass and other popular québécois artists. His height is 5"11.

Philippe Proulx is also a member of the group Flying Vomit.

He currently lives in Gentilly, Quebec.

Discography
 Pépé et sa guitare 2003
 Fakek' choz 2005
 100 % BOEUF 2007
 Pépé Goes Français 2009
 Le Véritable Amour 2011
 Engagé 2013
 Tout l'monde veut jouer avec Pépé 2016

External links
 Official website
 Site Flying Vomit website

References

1978 births
Living people
Musicians from Quebec
21st-century Canadian guitarists